Karl Wilhelm Ludwig Müller (13 February 1813 in Clausthal – 1894 in Göttingen) is best known for his still-useful Didot editions of fragmentary Greek authors, especially the monumental five-volume Fragmenta Historicorum Graecorum (FHG) (1841–1870), which is not yet completely superseded by the series Die Fragmente der griechischen Historiker begun by Felix Jacoby.

Works
 De Aeschyli Septem Contra Thebas, Diss. Göttingen (1836): online
 Fragmenta Historicorum Graecorum (1841–1870): vols. 1, 2, 3, 4, 5
 Arriani Anabasis et Indica. Scriptores rerum Alexandri Magni (fragmenta). Pseudo-Callisthenes (1846): online
 Oratores Attici (1847–1858): vols. 1–2
 Strabonis Geographica (1853): online
 Herodoti Historiarum libri ix. Ctesiae Cnidii et Chronographorum Castoris Eratosthenis etc. fragmenta (1858): online
 Geographi Graeci minores (1861–1882): vol. 1, vol. 2, tabulae
 Claudii Ptolemaei Geographia (1883–1901): vol. 1:1, vol. 1:2

References
Conrad Bursian, Geschichte der classischen Philologie in Deutschland, vol. 2, Munich, 1883, pp. 898–9.

1813 births
1894 deaths
German classical philologists
19th-century German historians
People from Hanover Region
19th-century German male writers
19th-century German writers
German male non-fiction writers